Below are the results for season 1 of the North American Poker Tour (NAPT).

Results

PokerStars Caribbean Adventure
 Casino: Atlantis Resort, Bahamas
 Buy-in: $10,000 + $300
 7-Day Event: January 5, 2010 to January 11, 2010
 Number of buy-ins: 1,529
 Total Prize Pool: $14,831,300
 Number of Payouts: 224

PokerStars Caribbean Adventure High Roller
 Casino: Atlantis Resort, Bahamas
 Buy-in: $25,000 + $500
 4-Day Event: January 11, 2010 to January 14, 2010
 Number of buy-ins: 84
 Total Prize Pool: $2,058,000
 Number of Payouts: 16

NAPT Venetian
 Casino: The Venetian, Paradise, Nevada
 Buy-in: $4,750 + $250
 5-Day Event: February 20, 2010 to February 24, 2010
 Number of buy-ins: 872
 Total Prize Pool: $4,017,740
 Number of Payouts: 128

NAPT Venetian High Roller Bounty Shootout
 Casino: The Venetian, Paradise
 Buy-in: $25,000 + $600 ($20,000 to Prize Pool / $5,000 for Bounty)
 2-Day Event: February 23, 2010 to February 25, 2010
 Number of buy-ins: 49
 Total Prize Pool: $1,240,000
 Number of Payouts: 7

NAPT Mohegan Sun
 Casino: Mohegan Sun, Uncasville, Connecticut
 Buy-in: $4,700 + $300
 5-Day Event: April 7, 2010 to April 11, 2010
 Number of buy-ins: 716
 Total Prize Pool: $3,365,200
 Number of Payouts: 104

NAPT Mohegan Sun High Roller Bounty Shootout
 Casino: Mohegan Sun, Uncasville, Connecticut
 Buy-in: $20,000 + $5,000 (bounty) + $600
 2-Day Event: April 23, 2010 to April 25, 2010
 Number of buy-ins: 35
 Total Prize Pool: $875,000
 Number of Payouts: 6

NAPT Los Angeles
 Casino: Bicycle Casino, Los Angeles, California
 Buy-in: $4,750 + $250
 6-Day Event: November 12, 2010 to November 17, 2010
 Number of buy-ins: 701
 Total Prize Pool: $3,229,857
 Number of Payouts: 104

References

External links
Official site

North American Poker Tour
2010 in poker

bg:Северноамерикански покер тур